Dap Chhuon, also known as Chuan Khemphet, Khem Phet, Chhuon Mochulpech or Chhuon Mchoul Pich (1912–1959) was a right-wing Cambodian nationalist, guerrilla leader, regional warlord, and general.

Chhuon was born in Siem Reap and grew up in Prey Veng, joining the French militia in which he rose to the rank of  sergeant. In the Franco-Thai War he was captured by - or deserted to - Thai forces, and in 1943 again deserted from the Cambodian National Guard at Bang Mealas, allegedly in the possession of his men's pay. By the mid-1940s, Chhuon was backed by the Thai government in organising anti-French guerrilla bands in the area of Siem Reap.

In August 1946 a disparate group of activists led by Chhuon, Prince Norodom Chantaraingsey and the leftist Son Ngoc Minh fought French troops in Siem Reap over the course of several days. Chhuon went on to become a leader of the Khmer People's Liberation Committee, a grouping of various regional elements of the Khmer Issarak resistance. However, in late 1949 he and his men went over to the French, who rewarded him with virtual control of parts of northern Cambodia and an official military post as commander of the "Franco-Khmer Corps".

Chhuon had a reputation for extreme brutality which had rapidly alienated the other Issarak leaders, and ruled effectively by personal decree. He was held in awe by the local peasantry. They accredited him with powers of invulnerability, reinforced by his habit of demonstrating feats of strength and his "daunting" appearance, being cadaverously thin with "unblinking, deep-set eyes".

By 1954 and Cambodian independence, Chhuon had again switched allegiance, this time to the new government of Norodom Sihanouk; Sihanouk even took him to the Geneva Conference in order to demonstrate that he had Issarak support. In October 1954, in the run-up to the 1955 elections, Chhuon formed an alliance between his 'Victorious North-East' political party and several other small parties (including Lon Nol's Khmer Renovation party) which proclaimed themselves as monarchist, traditionalist and rightist. This rightist alliance formed the basis of Sihanouk's Sangkum Reastr Niyum political organisation. During the 1955 elections, Chhuon's militia were routinely used to break up rallies of Sangkum opponents and intimidate voters.

Chhuon became Sihanouk's Internal Security Minister, and the Governor of Siem Reap Province. Although he had begun his career fighting alongside the Viet Minh, Chhuon's increasingly strident anticommunism caused him to be suggested by Robert McClintock, the US Ambassador to Cambodia between 1954 and 1956, to cultivate as a possible replacement for Sihanouk. His disagreements with Sihanouk over the latter's courting of communist China led to him being dropped from the cabinet in 1957, however, and he began to openly break with Sihanouk's regime.

In 1959 Chhuon was exposed in an allegedly Central Intelligence Agency-funded coup plot (the "Dap Chhuon Plot" or Bangkok Plot), and Sihanouk ordered his arrest. According to one account, Chhuon was surprised at his home by Lon Nol's security forces and despite escaping clad only in an under-sarong, he was quickly recaptured and killed. Sihanouk was later to claim that Lon Nol had secretly ordered Chhuon to be shot at capture in order to avoid being implicated in the coup himself.

One of Chhuon's brothers, Kem Srey, was closely associated with him in his political activities and another brother, Kem Penh, was an international arms dealer. A half-brother, Slat Peou (1929–60), an embassy worker and later the Sangkum delegate for Siem Reap, was executed for his involvement in the 1959 plot.

References

Cambodian anti-communists
Cambodian generals
Cambodian independence activists
Assassinated Cambodian people 
People of the First Indochina War
People from Prey Veng province
People from Siem Reap province
1912 births
1959 deaths